Bernard Strehler (1925–2001) was an early biogerontologist. He published the book Time, Cells, and Aging.

In 1949, he helped discover the firefly luciferin 2, which gives off light after being combined with ATP. In 1956, he switched to the field of aging. He joined the faculty of the University of Southern California as a professor of biology and director of biological research at the USC Ethel Percy Andrus Gerontology Center.

References

1925 births
2001 deaths
Biogerontologists
University of Southern California faculty
American biologists
20th-century biologists